Troyanov is a surname. Notable people with the surname include:

Ilija Trojanow (born 1965), also transliterated "Ilya Troyanov," Bulgarian–German writer, translator, and publisher
Konstantin Troyanov (born 1995), Russian football player
Vyacheslav Troyanov, (1875–1918), Russian general